Hasanabad-e Nazarian (also Romanized as Ḩasanābād-e Naz̧arīān and Ḩasanābād-e Naz̧areyān; also known as Ḩasanābād) is a village in Hoseynabad Rural District, Esmaili District, Anbarabad County, Kerman Province, Iran. At the 2006 census, its population was 154, in 32 families.

References 

Populated places in Anbarabad County